The 1928 Green Bay Packers season was their tenth season overall and their eighth season in the National Football League. The team finished with a 6–4–3 record under player/coach Curly Lambeau earning them a fourth-place finish.

Schedule

Standings

References
Sportsencyclopedia.com

Green Bay Packers seasons
Green Bay Packers
Green Bay Packers